Euphémie Muraton (née Duhanot; 1836–1914) was a French painter.

Biography
Muraton was born on 11 April 1836 in Beaugency. She married fellow painter  (1824–1911) with whom she had one son, also a painter. She exhibited at the Paris Salon from 1868 to 1913. Muraton exhibited her work in the Woman's Building at the 1893 World's Columbian Exposition in Chicago, Illinois.

She died in 1914.

Gallery

References

External links
 
 images of Euphémie Muraton's work on ARTnet

1840 births
1932 deaths
19th-century French women artists
20th-century French women artists
19th-century French painters
20th-century French painters